Stephen Mitchell & Sons was a Scottish tobacco manufacturing company, established in Linlithgow in 1723. Mitchell is regarded as one of the earliest and the most significative player in Scottish tobacco production.

His grandson, also named Stephen Mitchell (1789–1874), was born in Linlithgow on 19 September 1789. On the death of his own father (the founder's grandson) in 1820 Stephen continued the family business, transferring it in 1825 to Candleriggs in Glasgow. In 1832 the business moved again, to St Andrew's Square.

Mitchell retired to Moffat in 1859 and died there on 21 April 1874 following a fall. He never married, and left a public bequest of £66,998 10s 6d to ensure the establishment and maintenance of a public library in Glasgow, to be known as the Mitchell Library. The library was formally opened on 1 November 1877 by the Hon. James Bain, Lord Provost, and on Monday 5 November its doors were opened to the public. By 1977, it laid claim to being the largest public reference library in Europe.

The tobacco business finally merged with W. D. & H. O. Wills in 1901. Wills then amalgamated with other tobacco companies to become the Imperial Tobacco Company.

References

Tobacco companies of the United Kingdom
Imperial Brands
1723 establishments in Scotland
British companies established in 1723